Marwan Farhat (born 21 March 1957) is a Syrian television actor and  voice actor.

Early life
Marwan Farhat was born in Damascus, Syria.  After finishing secondary school, he attended the Higher Institute for Dramatic Arts in Damascus.

He began his acting career in 1981. He has worked as a voice actor and also as a film and television actor. His voice roles as a dubbing actor include

Dubbing Role 
 Kogoro Mori and Dr. Agasa in Detective Conan 
 Roronoa Zoro in One Piece
 Naruto - Guy Iruka Umino
 Ginga Sengoku Gun'yūden Rai

References

1957 births
Living people
People from Damascus
Syrian male television actors
Syrian male voice actors
Syrian voice directors